Mark Kelson (born 7 March 1976) is a Melbourne born musician, best known for his work as a member of The Eternal, Cryptal Darkness (1995–2002) & Alternative 4 (2010–2013).

Career
Mark Kelson began his music career in the doom band Cryptal Darkness. After three full length albums and several personal differences in the band, Mark left the band to begin his most successful project to date, The Eternal. Mark has since recorded four full length albums with The Eternal and toured extensively through Europe, North America, Mexico, Canada and parts of Asia, including Japan. The band was set to do their second Japanese tour in April 2011 but due to the tsunami that hit Japan a few days earlier, the band's Japanese label was forced to postpone the tour.

The Eternal worked with Canadian musician Jeff Martin of the multi-platinum band The Tea Party on their last album, 'Under A New Sun'. The album was co-produced by Martin and Kelson and also features them singing a duet on the song 'The Sleeper'.

During 2011, Mark worked with Duncan Patterson (ex-Anathema, ex-Antimatter) to create a debut album called 'The Brink' for Duncan's new band.  The band is called Alternative 4, which Duncan named after the Anathema album of the same name (a title he penned during his time in Anathema). The album was released in November 2011 on Avantgarde Music. This is not the first time Mark and Duncan have worked together, with Mark contributing to Duncan's earlier project, Íon.

In 2007 Mark toured through Switzerland, Mexico, North America and Canada as a session guitarist for avant-garde metal act Virgin Black.

With many years studio experience behind him, Mark went on to study sound production and is currently also working as a studio sound engineer and producer with many up-coming Australian & international bands.

Between 2011 & 2012 Mark completed two European tours as the frontman & guitarist of UK band Alternative 4.

Mark completed production on the new album by The Eternal called When The Circle of Light Begins To Fade. A well as performing on the album, Mark engineered, mixed & produced the album. This album saw the band tour Australia with Finnish band Amorphis in October 2013.

In May 2014 Mark completed his first solo acoustic tour of Japan with shows in Yokohama, Tokyo & Kyoto.

As of the end of May 2014 Mark has almost completed work on his first Solo album Resurgence. The album is set for an August release.

Mark also writes a series of articles on sound production for Japanese Magazine DiGiRECO, focusing on home recording techniques.

Discography

Solo
2014 – Mark Kelson – Resurgence (Sombre Light)

The Eternal
2018 – The Eternal – Waiting For The Endless Dawn (Inverse Records)
2013 – The Eternal – When The Circle of Light Begins To Fade (Sombre Light/Stay Metal Records)
2011 – The Eternal – Live At The East Brunswick Club (Sombre Light/Stay Metal Records)
2011 – The Eternal – Under A New Sun (Sombre Light/Stay Metal Records)
2010 – The Eternal – Under A New Sun CD Single (Sombre Light)
2008 – The Eternal – Kartika (Firebox Records/Stay Metal Records)
2005 – The Eternal – Sleep Of Reason (Firebox Records)
2004 – The Eternal – The Sombre Light Of Isolation (Firebox Records)
2003 – The Eternal – Promo 2003 (Independent)

Other
2019 – Suldusk – Luna Falls (Northern Silence Productions)
2011 – Alternative 4 – The Brink (Prophecy Productions)
2011 – Rainshadow – Waters Imperium (Independent)
2010 – Íon – Immaculada (Equilibrium Music)
2008 – Ashkhara – Soul Burning (Promo CD)
2007 – InSomnius Dei – Illusions Of Silence (Firebox Records)
2007 – Rainshadow – End Songs (Independent)
2007 – Painted Black – Verbo (Independent)
2006 – Íon – Madre, Protégenos (Equilibrium Music)
2006 – Rainshadow – Demo 2006 (Independent)
2002 – ThreeThirteen – ThreeThirteen (Independent)
2000 – Cryptal Darkness – Chapter II The Fallen (Icon Records)
1999 – Cryptal Darkness – They Whispered You Had Risen (Icon Records)
1997 – Cryptal Darkness – Promotional Sampler 1997 (Icon Records)
1996 – Cryptal Darkness – Endless Tears (Obscure Productions)
1996 – Cryptal Darkness – Descend Into Thy Grave (Obscure Productions)
1995 – Paramaecium – Within The Ancient Forest (Independent)

References

An interview with Mark @ metalobsession.net 01/02/11
Official site of The Eternal
markkelson.com, full discography and news
Íon, official website

External links
markkelson.com, full discography and news
Official site of The Eternal
Official site of Kelsonic Studios

Living people
Musicians from Melbourne
1976 births
Australian heavy metal singers
Paramaecium members
21st-century Australian singers